David Eugene Lucas Sr. (born April 23, 1950) is an American politician. He is a member of the Georgia State Senate from the 26th District, serving since 2012. He is a member of the Democratic party. Prior to being a Senator, he served in the Georgia House of Representatives from 1974 to 2011. Lucas is also a founding member of 100 Black Men of America. He is the father of comedian David Lucas and gridiron football player Al Lucas who died during a game while playing for the Los Angeles Avengers.

References

External links
 Profile at the Georgia State Senate

Living people
Democratic Party Georgia (U.S. state) state senators
1950 births
Democratic Party members of the Georgia House of Representatives
People from Peach County, Georgia
21st-century American politicians